The 1979 Asian Men's Handball Championship was the second Asian Championship, which was held from 1 to 11 November 1979, in Nanjing, China.
acted as the Asian qualifying tournament for the 1980 Summer Olympics in Moscow.

Results

Final standing
Japan qualified for Olympic tournament 1980 but refused to play, China apparently too. So Kuwait took their place.

South Korea probably did not participate, because the tournament was played in China.

References

External links
Asian Handball Federation

Handball
Asian Handball Championships
A
Handball
November 1979 sports events in Asia